Felt 3: A Tribute to Rosie Perez is the third studio album by Felt, an American hip hop duo made up of Murs and Slug. It is a concept album meant as a tribute to actress Rosie Perez. Produced by Aesop Rock, it was released by Rhymesayers Entertainment in 2009. It peaked at number 131 on the Billboard 200 albums chart.

Critical reception

At Metacritic, which assigns a weighted average score out of 100 to reviews from mainstream critics, the album received an average score of 79, based on 8 reviews, indicating "generally favorable reviews".

Track listing

Personnel
Credits adapted from liner notes.

 Murs – vocals
 Slug – vocals
 Aesop Rock – production
 DJ Big Wiz – turntables
 Jeremy Fish – vocals (3)
 Jacob – vocals (9)
 Allyson Baker – bass guitar (11)
 Jessie – vocals (18)
 Joey Raia – mixing
 Chris Gehringer – mastering
 MK Larada – illustration, design
 Dan Monick – photography

Charts

References

External links
 

2009 albums
Murs (rapper) albums
Rhymesayers Entertainment albums
Albums produced by Aesop Rock
Sequel albums
Tribute albums to non-musicians